Peter Kostolanský (born 8 August 1985) is a Slovak football goalkeeper who is currently playing for SFM Senec.

External links
 Player profile on footballstats.metro.co.uk
 Player profile on fotbalportal.cz 

1985 births
Living people
Slovak footballers
Slovakia youth international footballers
Association football goalkeepers
FC Spartak Trnava players
Czech First League players
SK Kladno players
MŠK Rimavská Sobota players
Slovak Super Liga players
Sportspeople from Trnava